Tingena oxyina is a species of moth in the family Oecophoridae. It is endemic to New Zealand and has been observed in the Otago region. This species inhabits native beech forest at altitudes of between 1000 - 3000 ft. Adults of this species are on the wing in January.

Taxonomy

This species was first described by Edward Meyrick in 1883 using specimens collected at Lake Wakatipu and named Cremnogenes oxyina. Meyrick went on to give a more detailed description in 1884. In 1915 Meyrick placed this species within the Borkhausenia genus. In 1926 Alfred Philpott studied the genitalia of the male of this species. George Hudson discussed and illustrated this species under the name B. oxyina in his 1928 publication The butterflies and moths of New Zealand. The illustration by George Hudson, as figured below, was regarded by J. S. Dugdale as a pale representation of the species. In 1988 Dugdale placed this species in the genus Tingena. The male lectotype is held at the Natural History Museum, London.

Description 

Meyrick first described this species as follows:

Meyrick gave a more detailed description as follows:

Meyrick stated that this species could be distinguished from its close relatives by its reddish-ochreous colouring and that the female of this species was very similar in appearance to the larger T. phegophylla.

Distribution 
This species is endemic to New Zealand and has been observed in the Otago region.

Behaviour 
Adults of this species are on the wing in January.

Habitat 
This species has been observed in Nothofagus solandri dominant native beech forest at altitudes of between 1000 - 3000 ft.

References

Oecophoridae
Moths of New Zealand
Moths described in 1883
Endemic fauna of New Zealand
Taxa named by Edward Meyrick
Endemic moths of New Zealand